Sylvania Airport  is a privately owned public use airport located near Sylvania, an unincorporated community 3 miles (5 km) west of the central business district of the village of Sturtevant, in Racine County, Wisconsin, United States.

Although most airports in the United States use the same three-letter location identifier for the FAA and International Air Transport Association (IATA), this airport is assigned C89 by the FAA but has no designation from the IATA.

Skydive Midwest is based at the airport.

Facilities and aircraft 
Sylvania Airport covers an area of 34 acres (13 ha) at an elevation of 788 feet (240 m) above mean sea level. It has two runways: 8R/26L is 2,272 by 38 feet (693 x 12 m) with an asphalt surface and 8L/26R is 2,343 by 120 feet (714 x 37 m) with a turf surface.

For the 12-month period ending June 2, 2022, the airport had 23,000 aircraft operations, an average of 63 per day; all general aviation.
In January 2023, there were 47 aircraft based at this airport: 43 single-engine, 3 multi-engine and 1 ultra-light.

See also
 List of airports in Wisconsin

References

External links 

Airports in Wisconsin
Buildings and structures in Racine County, Wisconsin
Airports in Racine County, Wisconsin